Pillankuli is a village in the Pattukkottai taluk of Thanjavur district, Tamil Nadu, India.

Demographics 

As per the 2001 census, Pillankuli had a total population of 574 with 277 males and 297 females. The sex ratio was 1072. The literacy rate was 62.96.

References 

 

Villages in Thanjavur district